Zeng Jian (born 19 November 1996) is a Singaporean table tennis player. She won three Under-21 singles titles at the 2016 ITTF World Tour.

Career
In late 2014, Zeng registered with the Singapore Table Tennis Association with hopes to acquire Singaporean nationality and play for the Singapore national team. She acquired Singaporean nationality in November 2019.

2022 
Zeng took part in the  2022 Commonwealth Games held in Birmingham. She won two golds in the women's team and doubles events. In the singles event, she was leading 3 sets and eventually losing to compatriot Feng Tianwei 3-4 in all-Singapore final to claim the silver.   She partnered Feng Tianwei to defeat the Australian duo Jee Minhyung and Jian Fang Lay 3-0 in the finals.

At the 2022 World Team Table Tennis Championships at Chengdu, she led the team of Zhou Jingyi, Wong Xinru, Goi Rui Xuan and Zhang Wanling to top Group 4 by defeating Iran, Luxembourg & South Korea.  The team qualifies to the knock-out rounds and won Czech Republic 3-1 in the Round of 16 to progress to the Quarter-Final to face 7th seed, Chinese Taipei.  Zeng secured two points by defeating world no. 35 Cheng I-ching and world no. 22 Chen Szu-yu but was not enough for the win as the team fell to Chinese Taipei 2-3. Throughout this tournament, she notched an impressive streak of eight wins in seven days.

References

1996 births
Living people
Chinese female table tennis players
Chinese emigrants to Singapore
Singaporean sportspeople of Chinese descent
People from Loudi
Kinoshita Abyell Kanagawa players
Table tennis players from Hunan
Chinese expatriate sportspeople in Japan
Expatriate table tennis people in Japan
Naturalised table tennis players
Naturalised citizens of Singapore
Singaporean female table tennis players
Table tennis players at the 2022 Commonwealth Games
Commonwealth Games gold medallists for Singapore
Commonwealth Games medallists in table tennis
Singaporean expatriate sportspeople in Japan
Competitors at the 2021 Southeast Asian Games
Southeast Asian Games silver medalists for Singapore
Southeast Asian Games bronze medalists for Singapore
Southeast Asian Games medalists in table tennis
Medallists at the 2022 Commonwealth Games